The 1979–80 season was Liverpool Football Club's 88th season in existence and their 18th consecutive season in the First Division. Liverpool won its 12th league title, and its second in successive seasons. David Johnson was the top scorer while Kenny Dalglish, Phil Neal and Phil Thompson were regularly starting in the side. In the European Cup, there was an early disappointment with a loss to Dinamo Tbilisi in the first round.  Liverpool went on to lose in the semi-finals of the FA Cup to the eventual runners-up, Arsenal, after a four-game marathon. They also lost in the semi-finals of the Football League Cup to the eventual runners-up, Nottingham Forest, who lost in the final to Wolverhampton Wanderers, a side captained by former Liverpool captain Emlyn Hughes, who left Liverpool before the start of the league season.

Squad

Goalkeepers
  Ray Clemence
  Steve Ogrizovic

Defenders
  Avi Cohen
  Brian Kettle
  Colin Irwin
  Phil Neal
  Alan Hansen
  Phil Thompson
  Alan Kennedy
  Richard Money

Midfielders
  Jimmy Case
  Steve Heighway
  Sammy Lee
  Ray Kennedy
  Terry McDermott
  Kevin Sheedy
  Graeme Souness

Attackers
  David Fairclough
  Kenny Dalglish
  Howard Gayle
  David Johnson
  Frank McGarvey

League table

Results

First Division

FA Charity Shield

FA Cup

League Cup

European Cup

References
  LFC History.net – Games for the 1979–80 season
Liverweb - Games for the 1979-80 season

Liverpool F.C. seasons
Liverpool
English football championship-winning seasons